Téo Kardum (born 24 July 1986, in Split) is a Croatian retired association footballer.

Club career
He had a season with Icelandic third tier-side ÍF Huginn.

References

External links
 
 Football Swiss

1986 births
Living people
Footballers from Split, Croatia
Association football midfielders
Association football forwards
Croatian footballers
Croatia youth international footballers
GNK Dinamo Zagreb players
NK Inter Zaprešić players
NK Varaždin players
FC Libourne players
FC Stade Nyonnais players
HNK Zmaj Makarska players
Tyrnavos 2005 F.C. players
NK Dugopolje players
NK Uskok players
Íþróttafélagið Huginn players
Croatian Football League players
Ligue 2 players
First Football League (Croatia) players
2. deild karla players
Croatian expatriate footballers
Expatriate footballers in France
Croatian expatriate sportspeople in France
Expatriate footballers in Switzerland
Croatian expatriate sportspeople in Switzerland
Expatriate footballers in Greece
Croatian expatriate sportspeople in Greece
Expatriate footballers in Iceland
Croatian expatriate sportspeople in Iceland